Mirza ( or) is a name of Persian origin. It is used as a surname or prefix to identify patriarchal lineage.

It is  a historical royal and noble title, denoting the rank of a royal prince, high nobleman, distinguished military commander, or a scholar. Specifically, it was used as a title by (and today signifies patriarchal lineage to) the various Persian Empires, the Nogai Horde, Shirvanshahs and Circassians of the European Caucasus, as well as the Muslim Rajputs and mainly the Mughals / Moguls, both of the Indian Subcontinent. It was also a title bestowed upon members of the highest aristocracies in Tatar states, such as the Khanates of Kazan and Astrakhan.

Etymology
The original title Mīrzā or Merzāh is derived from the Persian term Amīrzādeh which literally means child of the Amīr or child of the ruler. Amīrzādeh in turn consists of the Arabic title Amīr (English: Emir), meaning "commander" and the Persian suffix zādeh, meaning "son of" or "lineage of". Due to vowel harmony in Turkic languages, the alternative pronunciation Morza (plural morzalar; derived from Persian) is also used.

History
Mirza first emerged during the 15th century as an appellative term for members of the Timurid dynasty, adopted in deference to their progenitor, the Central Asian conqueror Timur, who used Amir as his principal title. During the early Timurid period, Mirza preceded a prince's given name, therefore adhering to the Persian fashion, though subsequently the Turkish style was adopted, with the title instead being placed after. This was continued by later rulers such as the Aq Qoyunlus, Safavids and Mughals.

Originally restricted to only kings and princes, the title eventually spread among other social groups, though only the former could have it placed after their given name. During the 16th century, the Safavids conferred it upon high-ranking viziers such as Mirza Shah Hossein and Mirza Ata-Allah Isfahani. By the Qajar period, the title simply marked a person as a clerk or a literate man of consequence. Writing in 1828, Frederic Shoberl records that "as a prefix to the name, it may be assumed by, or conferred on any person. It is right, however, to observe, that none but well-educated men, or such as follow respectable professions, or hold honourable posts, take the title of mirza."

Persian empires

Safavid dynasty

Padeshah Ali Mirza
Prince Alqas Mirza
Prince Mohammad Baqer Mirza
Vizier Mirza Shokrollah Isfahani
Vizier Mirza Salman Jaberi
Vizier Mirza Shah Hossein

Afsharid dynasty

Prince Reza Qoli Mirza
Prince Shahrokh Mirza
Prince Ebrahim Mirza
Statesman Mirza Mehdi Khan
Prince Nader Mirza

Qajar dynasty

Prince Iraj Mirza
Prince Malek Mansur Mirza Shao es-Saltaneh
Prince Bahram Mirza Sardar Mass'oud
Prince Abbas Mirza
Prince Abdol Majid Mirza
Prince Ali-Mohammad Mirza
Prince Bahram Mirza
Prince Djahangir Mirza
Prince Eskandar Mirza
Prince Hamid Mirza
Prince Khanlar Mirza
Prince Khosrow Mirza
Prince Muhammad Mirza
Prince Mahmoud Mirza
Prince Mohammad Hassan Mirza
Prince Mohammad Hassan Mirza II
Prince Ahmad Shah Qajar
Prince Nosrat-od-Dowleh Firouz Mirza
Prince Firouz Mirza Nosrat-ed-Dowleh Farman Farmaian III
Prince Ali Mirza Qajar
Prince Nosrat al-Din Mirza Salar es-Saltaneh
Prince Abdol-samad Mirza Ezz ed-Dowleh Saloor
Prince Mass'oud Mirza Zell-e Soltan
Prince Mohammad Ali Mirza Dowlatshah
Prince Mohammad Taqi Mirza
Prince Kamran Mirza Nayeb es-Saltaneh

Shirvanshahs 
Three consecutive titular kings of Shirvan, of the Shirvanshah Dynasty (present-day Azerbaijan), adopted the title as well following the death of Gurban Ali.
 Gasim Mirza
 Kavus Mirza
 Abu Bakr Mirza

Circassians

Circassian dynasty

The hereditary title of Mirza was adopted by the nobility class of the Circassians. Idar of Kabardia, also known as "Mirza Haydar Temruk Bey", was the great-grandson of Prince Inal – Sultan of Egypt the founder of the "Temruk dynasty" of the Kabardian princes, known in Russia as the "Cherkassky" a Circassian princely family.

Circassian nobility with the name Mirza include:
 Mirza Haydar Temruk Bey (ca. 1470 – 1571)
Princely Issues:
 Temruk Mirza (ca. 1501 – 1571)
 Kambulat Mirza (ca. 1510 – 1589)
 Zhelegot Mirza (ca. 1520- ?)

Russian empire
Under Catherine the Great, empress of Russia, the Mirzas gained equal rights with the Russian nobility due to their extreme wealth. Abdul Mirza was given the title Prince Yusupov, and his descendant Prince Felix Yusupov married Princess Irina Alexandrovna of Russia, the only niece of Tsar Nicholas II.

Mughal empire

In the Indian subcontinent, the title Mirza was borne by an imperial prince. It was adopted as part of ones name, implying relationship to the Mongol dynasties like the Mughal dynasty (the Imperial House of Timur). In the traditional naming sequence of the Indian royal families, the title can be placed both before the name and after it, such as Prince Mirza Mughal or Prince Kamran Mirza. Prince Khusrau Mirza was the grandson of Emperor Babur (Babur Mirza), son of Emperor Jahangir and a brother of Emperor Shah Jahan. Emperor Akbar Shah II was known as Prince Mirza Akbar before his coronation. Emperor Babur took the imperial title of Padishah on 6 March 1508, before which he used the title Mirza.

Mughal dynasty

 Mirza Zahiruddin 1494–1530, first Mughal Emperor.
 Mirza Nasiruddin 1530–1539 & 1554–1555, second Mughal Emperor.
 Mirza Jalaluddin 1556–1605, third Mughal Emperor.
 Mirza Nuruddin Salim 1605–1627, fourth Mughal Emperor.
 Mirza Salafuddin Shahryar 1627–1628, de facto Ruler
 Mirza Shahabuddin Khurram 1628–1658, fifth Mughal Emperor.
 Mirza Muhiuddin Aurangzeb 1658–1707, sixth Mughal Emperor.
 Mirza Qutbuddin Azam 1707, seventh Mughal Emperor.
 Mirza Mu'azzam 1707–1712, eighth Mughal Emperor.
 Mirza Muizuddin Muhammad 1712–1713, ninth Mughal Emperor.
 Mirza Muinuddin Muhammad 1712–1719, tenth Mughal Emperor.
 Mirza Shamsuddin 1719, eleventh Mughal Emperor.
 Mirza Rafiuddin 1719, twelfth Mughal Emperor.
 Mirza Muhammad Nekusiyar 1719, thirteenth Mughal Emperor.
 Mirza Nasiruddin Roshan Akhtar, fourteenth Mughal Emperor.
 Ahmad Shah Mirza 1720–1748, fifteenth Mughal Emperor.
 Azizuddin Beg Mirza 1754–1759, sixteenth Mughal Emperor.
 Jalaluddin Mirza 1759–1760, seventeenth Mughal Emperor.
 Muhi-ul-Millat Mirza 1788–1806, eighteenth Mughal Emperor.
 Mirza Akbar 1806–1837, nineteenth Mughal Emperor.
 Sirajuddin Mirza 1837–1857, Mughal Emperor.
 Mirza Abdullah, son of Bahadur Shah II 1850–1897, Mughal Emperor.
 Mirza Aziz Koka (1542–1624), foster-brother of Akbar, son of Ataga Khan

Imperial families of Central India and Bengal

The archaic Bengali form of Mirza was Mridha in Bengal and Bihar.
 Mirza Shuja ud-din Muhammad Khan, second Nawab of Bengal, Bihar and Orissa.
 Mirza Asadullah, third Nawab of Bengal, Bihar and Orissa.
 Mirza Muhammad Ali, fourth Nawab of Bengal, Bihar and Orissa.
 Mirza Mohammad Siraj, fifth Nawab of Bengal, Bihar and Orissa.
 Mirza Hassan Ali Khan Bahadur, 18th Nawab of Bengal, Bihar and Orissa.
 Mirza Wasif Ali Khan, 19th Nawab of Bengal, Bihar and Orissa.
 Mirza Waris Ali Khan, 20th Nawab of Bengal, Bihar and Orissa.

Royal family of Awadh

 Mirza Muhammad Muqim Ali Khan, second Nawab Subahdar of Awadh (Oudh)
 Mirza Amani Asif-ud-Dawlah, fourth Nawab Subahdar of Awadh
 Mirza Asif Jah Wazir Ali Khan, fifth Nawab Subahdar of Awadh
 Mirza Wajid Ali Shah, eleventh Nawab Subahdar (fifth King) of Awadh

Rajput dynasty

Rajputs of Northern India

Originally being adversaries and opponents to the Mughal Emperors, the title Mirza was also adopted by the Muslim Rajputs of Northern India. The Rajput imperial families were descendants of ancient Indo-Aryan warriors who strategically formed blood alliances with Mughal aristocracy. The Rajputs were rulers of princely states comprising vast territories of Northern India, including the Punjab Region, Kashmir and Rajasthan. Inter-marriage between Mughal aristocracy and Rajput aristocracy became very common and various factions of Rajput kingdoms embraced the Islamic faith, giving rise to the term "Muslim Rajputs". Rajput rulers were also granted the title Mirza on account of being high-ranked commanders in the Mughal military. The meaning of Mirza (Persian origin) is identical to the meaning of Rajput (Sanskrit Origin).

Other notable people named Mirza

Sport
 Sania Mirza, Indian tennis player, former WTA number 1
 Fadi Merza, Syrian-Austrian middleweight kickboxer, former world champion kickboxing and Muay Thai
 Mirza Ali Baig, Pakistani mountaineer
 Mirza Bašić, Bosnian tennis player, winner 2018 Sofia Open
 Mirza Begić, Bosnian-Slovenian Olympic basketball player
 Mirza Delibašić, Bosnian basketball player
 Mirza Teletović, Bosnian basketball player
 Mirza Varešanović, Bosnian football manager
 Rasul Mirzaev, Russian MMA fighter

Academics and literature
 Heidi Safia Mirza (born 1958), British academic
 Iraj Mirza, Persian folk poet, also known as Jalaal-al-mamalek.
 Mirza Abu Taleb Khan, tax-collector and administrator from northern India, writer of an early travel guide to Europe.
 Mirza Athar Baig is a Pakistani novelist, playwright and short story writer.
 Mirza Gʻafur Gʻulom, Uzbek poet, writer, and literary translator, considered one of the most influential Uzbek writers of the 20th century. 
 Mirza Ghalib (born Mirza Asadullah Baig Khan), an Urdu and Persian poet from South Asia who adorned the Mughal court.
 Mirza Kalich Beg, Sindhi writer.
 Mirza Khan of "Mirza & Sahiba", a tragic romance story, based on true events, which is enshrined in Punjabi literature and commonly told in the Punjab region. Mirza of "Mirza & Sahiba" was of Kharal Muslim Rajput / Muslim Jat tribe of Puar Rajput descent. 
 Muhammad Munawwar Mirza, a prominent scholar, historian, writer and intellectual from Pakistan.
 Nawab Mirza Khan "Daagh", Urdu poet.

Arts and entertainment 
 Bashir Mirza also known as BM, a Pakistani painter.
 Haroon Mirza, Anglo-Pakistani artist born in London.
 Mirza Kadym Irevani, Azerbaijani artist.
 Shazia Mirza, English comedian.
 Aziz Mirza (born 1947), Indian film director, producer and writer.
 Dia Mirza, Indian actress and former "Miss Asia Pacific" titleholder.
 Mastan Haider Mirza, Indian Mafia boss, mobster and filmmaker; popularly known as the first "celebrity gangster" of Bombay.
 Mirza Babayev, Azerbaijani movie actor and singer. Honored Artist of the Azerbaijan SSR and People's Artist of Azerbaijan.
Mirza Nadeem Baig Mirza Nazeer Baig Mughal better known by his stage name Nadeem Baig, a Pakistani actor, singer and producer.
 Mohib Mirza is a Pakistani actor and television host.
 Saeed Mirza, Indian film director and screenwriter, considered one of the most influential parallel cinema movie makers in India.

Government
 Mirza Fakhrul Islam Alamgir, Bangladeshi politician, the incumbent secretary general of the Bangladesh Nationalist Party (BNP) since 2016
 Mirza Abbas, Bangladesh Nationalist Party politician. He was the Mayor of Dhaka City Corporation from 1991 to 1993
 Fahmida Mirza, first female Speaker of the National Assembly of Pakistan 
Hasnain Mirza, lawyer, barrister and Member of Parliament who was a Member of the Provincial Assembly (MPA) 
 Iskandar Ali Mirza, the first President and 4th Governor General of the Islamic Republic of Pakistan in 1956 
Mirza Ali Asghar Khan Amin al-Soltan, the last prime minister of Iran under Naser al-Din Shah Qajar 
 Mirza Ismail, Prime Minister, Jaipur (Diwan of Jaipur) (1942–1946) 
Mirza Kuchik Khan, early 20th-century revolutionary, Gilani Nationalist and the president of the Republic Of Gilan 
 Mirza Muzaffar Ahmad, a Federal Finance Minister and Finance Secretary, Chairman of Planning Commission of Pakistan Executive director of the World bank 
Mirza Nasrullah Khan, the first Iranian Prime Minister
Munira Mirza, Deputy Mayor of London and the Director of the Number 10 Policy Unit under UK Prime Minister Boris Johnson 
Zulfiqar Mirza, Pakistani politician affiliated with the Pakistan Peoples Party (PPP)

Judges and advocates 
 Mirza Aziz Akbar Baig, former Vice Chairman of the Pakistan Bar Council.
 Zafar Hussain Mirza, Pakistani judge and the father of former Home Minister of Sindh Zulfiqar Mirza.

Journalists 
 Janbaz Mirza was a writer, poet, and journalist from Pakistan.
 Tahir Mirza was a senior Pakistani journalist and former editor of Dawn, Pakistan's oldest and most widely circulated English-language newspaper.

Military
Mirza Ahmed Bey, one of the original Punjabi soldiers of the famed "Hodson's Horse" regiment of the British Indian Army, pictured in the historical 1858 photograph. He was a descendant of Mirza Hakim Bey, after whom the Indian village Hakimpur, Gurdaspur District is named.
 Mirza Aslam Baig a Former Chief of Army Staff of Pakistan.
 Mirza Baqi, 17th-century Mughal general
 Mirza Ghulam Murtaza was the chieftain of Qadian and a commander with the Sikh Army.
 Mirza Kuchak Khan was a Persian revolutionary who led the Jungle Movement in the northern jungles of Gilan Province.

Nobility and royalty
 Khan Muhammad Mirza, architect during the Mughal Era.
 Mirza Ali Behrouze Ispahani, Bangladeshi businessman from the Ispahani family and the chairman of M. M. Ispahani Limited.
 Mirza Hadi Baig, Mughal nobleman from Samarkand who was granted 80 villages by Babur.
 Mirza Najaf Khan, Indian courtier and Commander-in-Chief of the Mughal Imperial Army.
 Sikandar Mirza, Armenian courtier within Akbar's Mughal Empire
 Umer Sheikh Mirza, ruler, father of Mughal Prince Mirza Babar

Other people
 Mirza Ghulam Ahmad, Indian religious leader

See also 

 Rana (title)
Baig, Bey
Beg Khan
Emir
Khanzada
Begzada
Morza
Mughal (tribe)
Muslim Rajput
Nawab
Shahzada
Sultanzada
Mirza Ghassemi
Sayyid

Further reading

"Life of a Mirza" Chapter 7 (pp. 225–227) The Empire of the Great Mughals: History, Art and Culture (2004), by Annemarie Schimmel, .
Mirzah in The Wordsworth Dictionary of Phrase and Fable by Ebenezer Cobham Brewer, .
MI'RZA in Chambers's Encyclopaedia: A Dictionary of Universal Knowledge For the People. .
A. Jaimoukha The Circassians: A Handbook Routledge, Palgrave, 2001, pp. 157–60, .

Footnotes

References
Specific 

Sources
Brewer's Dictionary of Phrases and Fable, 16th edition Revised by Adrian Room, 1999
WorldStatesmen
Etymology Online

Noble titles
Surnames
Court titles
Royal titles
Titles in Iran
Titles in Azerbaijan
Titles in Russia
Titles in Bangladesh
Turkish titles
Turkic culture
Titles in Pakistan
Persian words and phrases
Pakistani families
Muslim families
Mughal nobility
Ottoman titles